Victoria Koblenko (born 19 December 1980, in Vinnitsa, Ukrainian SSR) is a Dutch actress, presenter and columnist of Ukrainian descent.

Early life and education
Koblenko was born and raised in Ukraine as an only child. At the age of twelve, she moved with her family to the Netherlands, where she attended gymnasium education (highest level of secondary education in the Netherlands) at Krimpenerwaard College from 1993 to 1999, where she mastered English, German and French, plus classical Latin and Greek. Koblenko is also fluent in Russian and Ukrainian as her native language, and Dutch as her second native language. She attended Leiden University between 1999 and 2008, where she obtained a BSc degree in Political Science in 2008. She also studied Russian science at the same university but did not finish this study.

Due to her background Koblenko is also regularly invited on talk shows of the national TV to explain political situations in Ukraine, as for example the Dutch referendum on the Association Agreement with Ukraine and the current Russo-Ukrainian War.

Career
Although as a child Koblenko never entertained the ambition of becoming an actress one day, she was featured in several TV commercials in her early teens. Koblenko achieved stardom when she played Isabella Kortenaer in the Netherlands' most popular and longest-running TV soap opera, "Goede Tijden, Slechte Tijden" ("Good Times, Bad Times"), from 2000 to 2010. Her first major film role was that of Marieke in the psychological thriller "Stille Nacht" (2004) which earned her the Favorite Actress Award at the 2004 edition of the Dutch Film Festival. The film was also enthusiastically received at the European Film Festival in Tuscany.

In August 2005, Koblenko was cast in the horror film "Doodeind" (2006). She also starred in the short film "American Dreams" (2006), playing the Russian wife of Lee Harvey Oswald. The film was shown at the International Film Festival Rotterdam and was named Best Short Film at the Hollywood Film Festival, which boosted her career even further. October 2006 saw the release of another film showcasing Koblenko's talents, the horror movie "Sl8n8". After several guest appearances in the TV series "Van Speijk" and "Boks", Koblenko played Kim van Meegen in the 12-part Dutch drama series "Vuurzee" ("Sea of Fire").

Drawing on her Eastern European background, she landed her first Russian-speaking role in TV series "Heritage". In 2009 she got her second Russian-speaking role in the TV series "Sisters" which aired on the 1st Channel in Russia.

In 2009 Koblenko started shooting for the first season Dutch TV drama series entitled "Bloedverwanten" ("Blood Relatives"). Koblenko played the role of Laura for 3 seasons which was first aired on AVRO in 2010.

In 2010 she starred in an on-line mockumentary called "Nigel & Victoria". In this series of eight short episodes, broadcast on YouTube, Koblenko played herself in the role of an on-camera spokesperson. She made her stage debut in September 2010 with the theatre play "Retour Hollandse Spoor" from the National Theatre directed by Johan Doesburg.

Production of the TV film "Van God Los" started March 2011. Koblenko played the part of Miranda. The film is directed by David Lammers for the BNN network. In 2012 another drama series voor BNN, "FEUTEN" has been filmed. Currently Koblenko is shooting a third season Dutch TV drama series entitled "Bloedverwanten" ("Blood Relatives").

Koblenko has appeared on several Dutch talk shows and entertainment programs, among them "The Weakest Link" and "Celebrity Mole". She keeps close tabs on global developments, writing a column for the daily newspaper "Trouw" and reporting on events in, for example, Uganda and Ukraine, where she also served as an election observer.

Charitable work
Koblenko supports several humanitarian organizations, including Amnesty International and UNICEF. She took her involvement one step further when she teamed up with Doctors Without Borders to produce a TV documentary about AIDS in her native Ukraine. Another case in point is her visit to the site of the Chernobyl disaster, in her capacity of goodwill ambassador for a local organization. Koblenko has been working to raise awareness for the Millennium Development Goals.

Filmography

Film

Television

Roles in television

References

External links

 
 
 
 
 
 

1980 births
Living people
Ukrainian film actresses
Ukrainian television actresses
Ukrainian television presenters
Ukrainian writers
21st-century Ukrainian actresses
Ukrainian humanitarians
Women humanitarians
Dutch film actresses
Dutch television actresses
Dutch television presenters
Dutch women television presenters
Dutch columnists
21st-century Dutch actresses
Dutch humanitarians
Leiden University alumni
People from Vinnytsia
Ukrainian emigrants to the Netherlands
Dutch women columnists
Ukrainian columnists
Ukrainian women columnists
Ukrainian women television presenters